Allan Thimmoy Ottey (born 18 December 1992) is a Jamaican international footballer who plays for Waterhouse F.C., as a striker.

Career

Club

Montego Bay United 
Ottey has played senior club football for Montego Bay United.

Faulkland FC 
In 2017, Ottey moved to Faulkland FC in the Western Super League.

Waterhouse FC 

In 2018, Ottey moved to Waterhouse F.C. reuniting with Donovan Duckie in the RSPL.

International 

Ottey has played for Jamaica at the U20 and senior team level.

Honours 
Jamaica National Premier League: 2
2014, 2016
'''Jamaica National Premier League runners up 2015
CONCACAF Gold Cup:2015 (Runner-up)

References

1992 births
Living people
Jamaican footballers
Jamaica international footballers
Montego Bay United F.C. players
2015 Copa América players
2015 CONCACAF Gold Cup players
Copa América Centenario players
National Premier League players
Association football forwards
Jamaica under-20 international footballers